The men's 5000 metres at the 2014 European Athletics Championships took place at the Letzigrund on 17 August.

Medalists

Records

Schedule

Results

Final

References

Final Results

5000 M
5000 metres at the European Athletics Championships